Åmot Idrettsforening is a Norwegian multisports club located in Åmot. It has sections for boxing, handball, football and cross-country skiing.

The football team being the most prominent, it played in the Second Division as late as 2007, but for the next season its first team merged with others to become Modum FK. Hence, Åmot's second team in the Fourth Division emerged as its new first team. In the 2008 season Åmot was runner up in Fourth Division and was promoted to Third Division. Åmot was relegated in 2009.

Recent seasons
{| 
|valign="top" width=0%|

References

External links
 Official website

Football clubs in Norway
Association football clubs established in 1919
1919 establishments in Norway